Curse of the Fly is a 1965 American horror science-fiction film and a sequel to Return of the Fly (1959), as the third installment in The Fly film series. It was released in 1965, and unlike the other films in the series was produced in the United Kingdom. The film was directed by Don Sharp and the screenplay was written by Harry Spalding.

Curse of the Fly was rarely seen for many years, as it was the only entry in the Fly film trilogy that did not receive a videotape, laserdisc or online release. It did not receive its home video premiere until 2007, when it was released in a boxed set with the original series of films.

Plot 
Martin Delambre is driving to Montreal one night when he sees a young girl by the name of Patricia Stanley running in her underwear. They fall in love and are soon married. However, they both hold secrets: she has recently escaped from a mental asylum; he and his father Henri are engaged in radical experiments in teleportation, which have already had horrific consequences. Martin also suffers recessive fly genes which cause him to age rapidly and he needs a serum to keep him young.

In a rambling mansion in rural Quebec, Martin and Henri have successfully teleported people between there and London, but the previous failures resulted in horribly disfigured and insane victims who are locked in the stables. Martin's first wife Judith is one of them, as are Samuels and Dill, two men who had worked as the Delambres' assistants. Martin's brother Albert mans the London receiving station but wishes to terminate the teleportation project and escape the obsession that has driven his grandfather, his father and his brother.

The police and the headmistress of the asylum trace Patricia to the Delambre estate, where they learn that she has married Martin, but it is soon discovered that he had a previous wife whom he did not divorce. Inspector Charas, who had investigated Andre Delambre and is now an old man in the hospital, tells Inspector Ronet about the Delambre family and their experiments.

As the police begin to close in, a mixture of callousness and madness afflicts the Delambres, and they decide to abandon their work and eliminate the evidence of their failures. They subdue and teleport Samuels and Dill, but upon reintegration in London the two men are fused into a single writhing mass. Albert is horrified at the sight and kills the thing with an axe, destroying the teleportation equipment in the process. Tai and Wan, a Chinese couple who had been helping the Delambres, have had enough and leave the Quebec estate.

Henri convinces Martin that they must send the unconscious Patricia to London and then follow in order to escape from the police. Martin resists, afraid that she might be harmed, so Henri volunteers to go first. Martin sends Henri to London, unaware that Albert has destroyed the reintegration equipment. Henri does not rematerialize and is lost. Realizing what has happened, Albert leaves the lab, sobbing, and is not seen again.

Inspector Ronet arrives at the estate, passing Tai and Wan as they drive away. Patricia awakens in the teleportation chamber but escapes before the transmission sequence is complete. Martin pursues her but starts aging again. Without his serum he quickly dies, sprawled across the front seat of his car. Soon after, Ronet finds him reduced to a skeleton, and he escorts the badly shaken Patricia back into the house.

Cast 

 Brian Donlevy as Henri Delambre
 George Baker as Martin Delambre
 Carole Gray as Patricia Stanley
 Burt Kwouk as Tai
 Yvette Rees as Wan
 Michael Graham as Albert Delambre
 Mary Manson as Judith Delambre
 Charles Carson as Inspector Charas
 Jeremy Wilkins as Inspector Ronet
 Rachel Kempson as Madame Fournier

Production 
The film was one of a series of movies Robert L. Lippert was making in England, in order to take advantage of the Eady Levy. He used an English producer, Jack Parsons. Parsons had previously made Witchcraft (1964) with director Don Sharp for Lippert and used them again on Curse of the Fly.

Lippert wanted to make a third "Fly" movie. Harry Spalding says he was reluctant to do it but Lippert said "you handle it, kid".

Although a sequel to The Fly and Return of the Fly, the backstory used for Curse of the Fly does not match the continuity of the first two films, but it does build its narrative on elements and characters from those films.

Curse of the Fly centers on Henri and Martin Delambre, identified as the son and grandson of the Andre Delambre character depicted in The Fly. Andre's invention of a teleportation device and subsequent accidental integration with a housefly remain within the backstory. However, his resultant assisted suicide is removed. Instead, his son, apparently a different character from the boy Philippe Delambre depicted in The Fly, was able to put both the altered man and the altered fly back into the teleportation chamber and successfully reverse the integration, as was done with an adult Philippe in Return of the Fly. The dialogue within Curse of the Fly contains no mention of Philippe, although a photograph shown in the film, which is supposed to be of Andre in his altered form from The Fly, is actually a production still from Philippe's transformation in Return of the Fly.

Spalding later said: "It wasn't all that bad a script. As a matter of fact, Don Sharp said the opening ten pages, where the girl is coming out of the insane asylum, was the best opening he'd ever had on film".

Harry Spalding said he wrote the lead for "a Claude Rains kind of guy" and was unhappy to get Brian Donlevy. Spalding thought this affected Don Sharp's confidence in the film.

Don Sharp later said he felt the script "wasn't good enough" and that he only took the job because he had been working for a long time as a second unit director on Those Magnificent Men in Their Flying Machines and was desperate to direct again. Despite it, he said there were some strong sequences.

Reception 

Dennis Schwartz of Ozus' World Movie Reviews, grading it B-, cited the film having an eerie atmosphere but called it "disappointing as it never is exciting—just too much chatter over pseudo-science".

The film was a box office disappointment.

See also 
 List of American films of 1965

References

External links 
 
 
 Curse of the Fly at BFI
 Curse of the Fly at TCMDB

1965 films
1960s monster movies
1965 horror films
1960s science fiction horror films
American black-and-white films
American monster movies
American science fiction horror films
American sequel films
British black-and-white films
British monster movies
British science fiction horror films
British sequel films
1960s English-language films

Films about shapeshifting
Films directed by Don Sharp
Films set in Quebec
Mad scientist films
20th Century Fox films
Teleportation in films
The Fly (franchise)
1960s American films
1960s British films